Telex may refer to:

 Telex (network), (TELegraph EXchange), a communications network
 Teleprinter, the device used on the above network
 Telegraphic transfer, an electronic means of transferring funds overseas
 Telex (anti-censorship system), a research project that would complement Tor (anonymity network)
 Telex (band), a Belgian pop group
 Telex (IME), a convention for writing Vietnamese using ASCII characters commonly found on computer keyboard layouts
 Tele-X, a Nordic communications satellite
 Telex Communications (formerly Telex Corporation), an American manufacturer of hearing aids, audio equipment, and computer peripherals.
 Telex II, a later name for the TWX teletypewriter network
 "Planet Telex", a song by rock band Radiohead
 Telephone exchange
 Telephone extension
 Telex.hu, a Hungarian news portal

See also 
 Telix, terminal emulation software
 Teletex, an old ITU-T standard
 Teletext, television information retrieval service